KCRT (1240 AM, "My 99.3") is a radio station broadcasting a variety hits music format. Licensed to Trinidad, Colorado, United States, the station is currently owned by Phillips Broadcasting, Inc. and features programming from Citadel Media.

History
On March 3, 2017, KCRT changed their format from classic country to variety hits, branded as "My 99.3".

References

External links

CRT
Radio stations established in 1946
1946 establishments in Colorado